Saccocera sauteri is a moth in the family Brachodidae. It was described by Kallies in 2004. It is found in Taiwan.

The wingspan is 20 mm for males and 24 mm for females. The forewings are fuscous-brownish with a narrow yellow streak along the cubital stem and single yellow scales scattered on the wings. The hindwings are fuscous-brown with two yellow poorly defined subbasal spots.

Etymology
The species is named in honour of the lepidopterist Hans Sauter.

References

Natural History Museum Lepidoptera generic names catalog

Brachodidae
Moths described in 2004